The Mindset, released in spring 1984, is an Intel 80186-based  MS-DOS personal computer. Unlike other IBM PC compatibles of the time, it has custom graphics hardware supporting 320x200 resolution with 16 simultaneous colors (chosen from a 512-shade palette), and hardware-accelerated drawing capabilities including a blitter which allows it to update the screen 50 times as fast as a CGA adapter in a standard PC. It is conceptually similar to the more successful Commodore Amiga released over a year later.

The system never sold well and disappeared from the market after about a year. This was lamented by industry commenters, who looked at this event as the first clear evidence of the end of innovation in favor of compatibility. Its distinctive case remains in the permanent collection of the Museum of Modern Art in New York.

History

Design
In most computer systems of the era, the CPU is used to create graphics by drawing bit patterns directly into memory. Separate hardware then reads these patterns and produces the actual video signal for the display. The Mindset was designed by ex-Atari engineers and added a new custom-designed VLSI vector processor to handle many common drawing tasks, like lines or filling areas. Instead of the CPU doing all of this work by changing memory directly, in the Mindset the CPU sets up those instructions and then hands off the actual bit fiddling to the separate processor.

Mindset's president compared the chipset to the Intel 8087 floating point processor, running alongside the Intel 80186 on which the machine is based. There are a number of parallels between the Mindset and the Amiga 1000, another computer designed by ex-Atari engineers that offered advanced graphics.

As development continued and it became clear that the machine would be ready before the MS-DOS-based Microsoft Windows 1.0 was, Bill Gates became personally involved in the project to assist Mindset in emulating IBM character graphics without losing performance. Once Mindset officials determined that most of the desirable software was compatible, development was frozen and the OS burned to ROM in late 1983. The ROM does not run about 20% of the PC software base, including Microsoft Flight Simulator. WordStar is one of the PC applications reported to run, and Mindset publicized a list of 60 applications that run unmodified. The software base was expected to increase dramatically once a final version of Windows was released.

Before its release, in early 1984 Jack Tramiel is rumored to have tried to buy Mindset's technology. before ultimately buying Atari and designing a new machine from off-the-shelf parts, the Atari ST.

Release

The Mindset was released on 2 May 1984. The base model with 64K RAM and no floppy disk drive sold for US$1,099, a 128K model with single disk was available for $1,798, and a 256K dual-disk version cost $2,398. The disk-less version of the machine was still usable, as the system also included two ROM cartridge ports on the front of the machine that could be used for the operating system and another program. The canonical cartridge is an extended version of GW-BASIC. The machine is packaged in a unique enclosure designed by GVO of Menlo Park, visually separated into two sections with the ROM slots in the lower half and the optional diskettes on the upper half. It was sold complete with a custom nylon carrying case.

Mindset's president said its graphics capabilities were unmatched except on US$50,000 workstations. At the time it garnered critical acclaim, with reviewers universally praising its graphics and overall performance which was much faster than contemporary PCs. although in many cases with the caveat that the market was rapidly standardizing.

Disappearance
By the summer of 1984, it was clear the system was not selling as expected, and the company re-purposed it for the video production and graphics design markets. That was followed in August by a round of layoffs, and another in January 1985, this time half the employees were let go. The company filed for Chapter 11 protection on 28 August 1985, and never emerged.

By 1985, when it was clear the system was not living up to its promise and Windows 1.0 was a flop in general, John J. Anderson published a review of the system decrying that the personal computer market was beginning to value compatibility over technology. He wrote:

Mindset II
The Base System Unit is referred to as Model M1001; later a "Mindset II" computer was released, a badge engineered version of the M1001, with an adhesive label designating "II" under the embossed name. Internally the Video Processor Board is a separate mini-daughterboard. Its enhanced functionality is not totally understood - but from the "Mindset II Advanced Professional Videographics System" user'a guide it makes mention of "Chaining" two Mindset's:

The Mindset II is referred to on the front of the user guide as Model# M1500, however other internal pages reference is an M1000-II and also make mention of Mindset Video Production Module Model# M1011.

Description
The system architecture is based on the Intel 80186, with proprietary VLSI chips that enhance and speed up the graphics. Although it is disk compatible with the IBM PC's DOS, its enhanced graphics capabilities make achieving full IBM compatibility more difficult than its competitors. Bill Gates became involved with development, assisting Mindset in emulating IBM character graphics without losing performance. Once Mindset officials determined that most of the desirable software was compatible, development was frozen and the OS burned to ROM, which locked out 20% of the PC software base, including Microsoft Flight Simulator. WordStar is one of the PC applications reported to run, and Mindset publicized a list of 60 applications that run unmodified. The software base was expected to increase dramatically once a final version of Windows was released.

Mindset's design is modular in many aspects. The top of the case has an opening to access its system bus; this allows for the expansion module to plug into the main computer module to add memory and one or two disk drives. The Mindset was designed by several ex-Atari engineers like the Amiga 1000, another computer of the era with an advanced graphics subsystem and modular expandability. Jack Tramiel (forming Tramel Technology, Ltd.) tried to buy Mindset's technology in Spring of 1984.

A dual 5.25" floppy drive module that sits above the main unit was available and part of the common sales configuration for the system. The module also includes expansion memory as well.

Mindset has dual front-mounted ROM cartridge ports with a locking knob on the left side of the main computer module to lock the ROM modules into place.  The Mindset has the option (through its System Configuration Utility) to be able to select whether the system boots from left or right ROM carts, or disk drive.  Cartridges can also contain CMOS RAM, which is retained when unplugged by a battery in the cartridge case. Cartridges were envisioned to be a primary medium for software distribution on the Mindset, but sales of the system were too low for cartridges to be economical, and software was distributed on disk instead.

While released in 1984, models of the M1001 Mindset computer with BIOS ROM code 1.07 and earlier show a copyright notice of (c) 1983 Mindset Computer Corp.

Rear ports
The rear of the computer is equipped with the following ports:

 Audio left
 Composite out
 TV/RF
 Channel 3/4 select switch
 RGB video
 EXT sync
 Aux in
 Aux out

The rear of the main computer module also has 3× 36 Pin Expansion bus slots.
The Dual Disk/Memory Expansion Unit adds an additional 3 36 Pin Expansion bus slots to the system.

Expansion Modules
 Dual Disk Drive / Memory Expansion Module. Some are marked Model # M1003 and others M1004, despite there being no internal or external differences.
 Parallel "Cartridge Module"
 Serial "Cartridge Module"
 Modem "Cartridge Module"
 128 kb memory "Cartridge Module"
 Hard Drive System, consisting of an Interface "Cartridge Module" and HD loader on NVRAM cartridge
 Stereo "Cartridge Module"

Peripherals

 Mouse
 Analog joystick
 Touch Tablet
 Video Fader

Video game
Only one video game has been released for the Mindset:
 Vyper (Synapse Software, 1984)

References

Citations

Bibliography

External links
 Specs, photos, and commentary regarding the Mindset Computer
 DigiBarn Computer Museum photos and commentary regarding the Mindset Computer
 Atari Museum entry regarding the Mindset Computer

Computer workstations
IBM PC compatibles
Computer-related introductions in 1984
Collection of the Museum of Modern Art (New York City)